Rossel Island (named after de Rossel, a senior officer on the French expedition of d'Entrecasteaux, 1791-1793; also known as Yela) is the easternmost island of the Louisiade Archipelago, within the Milne Bay Province of Papua New Guinea.

Geography
The higher parts of the island are almost constantly cloud-capped during the southeast monsoon. The mountain ridges form short, narrow crests, with occasional peaks; their outline is smooth, and the ridges are covered with vegetation. Most of the shoreline is either bordered by mangroves, with occasional sandy beaches, or covered with jungle. From the bluff to the island's north point, very steep hills slope down to the shore. Between the north point of the island and Cape Deliverance are some well-wooded valleys. The south side of the island consists of numerous points and bays, with steep hill ridges descending to the sea from the high mountain range above.

Mount Rossel
The highest elevation is Mount Rossel, near the eastern end of the island, which rises . This precipitous peak has steep ridges extending to the north and west, but it descends in more gentle slopes southeast to Cape Deliverance, the eastern end of the island. The eastern peak, Mount Mo, is flat-topped. The western peak is conical.

Reef
The fringing coral reef encloses the large Rossel Lagoon in the west and a smaller lagoon one in the east. Rossel Lagoon extends almost  from the northwestern point of the island to Rossel Passage at the western end of the fringing reef. The barrier reef encircling this lagoon is narrow and has four passages through it west of the island. The barrier reef on the south side of the island is unbroken east of Rossel Passage. Few of these shoals dry and the larger ones are usually awash. Since the water is so clear the shoals can usually be distinguished in good light.

Climate
Yela island has a tropical rainforest climate (Af) with heavy to very heavy rainfall year-round. The following climate data is for the main settlement of Jinjo.

History 
Rossel Island was first sighted and charted by Europeans on 14 July 1606 by the Spanish expedition of Luís Vaez de Torres. Together with Tagula Island it was charted as Tierra de San Buenaventura (Land of St. Bonaventure) as it was first sighted on the feast of that saint.

It was named after Elisabeth Paul Eduard de Rossel (1765–1829), French astronomer and Master-at-arms. He was on the frigate 'La Recherche' with Joseph Antoine Raymond Bruny d'Entrecasteaux on the search for the missing La Pérouse expedition, which was later written in 1809. 

In 1858, the island became notorious after the French ship Saint Paul transporting over 300 Chinese coolies destined for Australia became shipwrecked on the island. According to the testimony of survivors, the majority of the Chinese were killed and eaten by the native islanders.

Flora and fauna
Rossel Island is thickly wooded and nearly the whole south coast is a dense forest. Grassy patches are occasional. Guioa plurinervis (Sapindaceae) is endemic to this island.

Rosselia which is a genus of plants in the family Burseraceae and native to New Guinea was named after the island.

Demographics
In 2014, the population was 5,553, spread across 31 villages. The main village is Jinjo, on the east coast. The indigenous people speak the Yélî Dnye language, whose relation to other languages remains uncertain.

References

Islands of Milne Bay Province
Louisiade Archipelago